Mohammadhasanvand (also Romanized as Moḥammadḥasanvand) is a village in Honam Rural District, in the Central District of Selseleh County, Lorestan Province, Iran. At the 2006 census, its population was 21, in 5 families.

References 

Towns and villages in Selseleh County